National Military Memorial Park (NMM Park) is a tribute by people and the government, designed by Nisha Mathew Ghosh and Soumitro Ghosh to honor the men and families of martyrs  who have died in the service of the nation. National Military Memorial is located adjacent to Indira Gandhi Musical Fountain Park in Bangalore.

Rajeev Chandrasekhar, Member of Parliament is chairman of National Military Memorial Committee. The memorial was created after long legal battle that reached Supreme Court.

See also 
 Amar Jawan Jyoti in New Delhi 
 India Gate in New Delhi 
 National War Memorial in New Delhi.
 Kargil Vijay Diwas
 Vijay Diwas (India)
 Bijoy Dibos

References 

Military of India